Barbara Tucker (born March 19, 1967), is an American house and soul singer, songwriter and choreographer born in Brooklyn, New York, US. Tucker had six No. 1 hits on the US Hot Dance Club Songs chart in the 1990s and into the 2000s, and several hits in the UK.

Biography
Raised in Brooklyn, New York, Tucker started singing through her entertainer father, Jayotis Washington of the group, the Persuasions. As an actress, Tucker has performed in off-Broadway plays and received the T.O.R. award through the American Theater.  She has choreographed and danced for various dance artists, such as C&C Music Factory, Soul System, Jay Williams, and Deee-Lite. She also choreographed the first Club Music Award show and is choreographer for the Underground Network dancers. She has been managed by celebrity and sports manager Glenn Toby.

Tucker has recorded with and sang background vocals for Deee-Lite and George Clinton. She has collaborated with David Guetta and Blaze. She was signed to the production team Masters At Work (Little Louie Vega and Kenny "Dope" Gonzalez), who produced such tunes as "Deep Inside", "Beautiful People", "I Get Lifted", "Stay Together" and "Stop Playing With My Mind".

Tucker is the only recording artist to have had a yearly residency at Europe's clubbing mecca, Ibiza. In December 2016, Billboard magazine ranked her as the 63rd most successful dance artist of all-time.

Discography
 1994: "Beautiful People" - No. 1 US Hot Dance Club Songs; No. 20 US Hot Dance Music Maxi; No. 23 UK
 1994: "I Get Lifted" - No. 1 US Hot Dance Club Songs; No. 33 UK
 1995: "Stay Together" - No. 1 US Hot Dance Club Songs; No. 9 US Hot Dance Singles Sales; No. 46 UK
 1996: "Keep on Lovin'You"
 1996: "Hot Shot"
 1997: "Bring You Love"
 1998: "Everybody Dance (The Horn Song)" - No. 1 US Hot Dance Club Songs; No. 37 US Hot Dance Singles Sales; No. 28 UK
 2000: "Stop Playing With My Mind" (Barbara Tucker featuring Darryl D'Bonneau) - No. 1 US Hot Dance Club Songs; No. 25 US Hot Dance Singles Sales; No. 17 UK
 2001: "Love's On Time"
 2003: "Let Me Be"
 2005: "You Want Me Back"
 2005: "Most Precious Love" (Blaze presents Uda featuring Barbara Tucker) - No. 44 UK
 2006: "Most Precious Love" (Blaze featuring Barbara Tucker) (Freemasons  Remix) - No. 17 UK
 2007: "Love Vibrations" - No. 1 Hot Dance Club Songs
 2008: "One" with (Peter Luts)
 2009: "Care Free"
 2009: "Feelin' like a Superstar"
 2013: "I Wanna Dance with Somebody" (with The Cube Guys)
 2015: "Live Your Life" (DJ Federico Scavo)
 2015: "Boogie" (Ben Liebrand)
 2017: "Think (About It)" – No. 1 Hot Dance Club Songs

See also
List of number-one dance hits (United States)
List of artists who reached number one on the US Dance chart

References

External links
Tucker's label home and features her own site
Tucker interview by Pete Lewis, Blues & Soul, July 2008

1967 births
Living people
African-American women singer-songwriters
American soul singers
American contemporary R&B singers
American dance musicians
American house musicians
Musicians from Brooklyn
Singer-songwriters from New York (state)
21st-century African-American women singers
Positiva Records artists
20th-century African-American women singers